Opdycke is a surname. Notable people with the surname include:

Emerson Opdycke (1830–1884), American businessman and Union Army brigadier general
Sandra Opdycke (born 1936), American historian

See also
Opdyke (disambiguation)
Updike